Arzergrande is a comune (municipality) in the Province of Padua in the Italian region Veneto, located about  southwest of Venice and about  southeast of Padua.

The municipality of Arzergrande contains the frazione (subdivision) Vallonga.

Arzergrande borders the following municipalities: Codevigo, Piove di Sacco, Pontelongo.

Demographic evolution

References

Cities and towns in Veneto
Articles which contain graphical timelines